Gaudette is a surname. Notable people with the surname include:

 Adam Gaudette (born 1996), American ice hockey player
 André Gaudette (born 1947), Canadian ice hockey player
 Bill Gaudette (born 1981), American-born Puerto Rican footballer
 Maxim Gaudette (born 1974), Canadian actor
 Tom Gaudette (1923–1998), American businessman and community activist